Labeo microphthalmus is fish in the Cyprinid genus Labeo from north western India and Pakistan

References

Labeo
Fish described in 1877